Serine/threonine-protein kinase 19 is an enzyme that in humans is encoded by the STK19 gene.

This gene encodes a serine/threonine kinase which localizes predominantly to the nucleus. Its specific function is unknown; it is possible that phosphorylation of this protein is involved in transcriptional regulation. This gene localizes to the major histocompatibility complex (MHC) class III region on chromosome 6 and expresses two transcript variants.

See also
 RCCX

References

Further reading

EC 2.7.11